Bowderdale is a hamlet in Cumbria, England,  southwest of Kirkby Stephen. For most of its length the beck forms the boundary between the parishes of Ravenstonedale and Orton.

The name, first recorded in 1224 as Butheresdal, is from the Old Norse búthar 'of the booths or shelters' and á 'river', so means "valley of the river of booths or shelters".

References

External links

Villages in Cumbria
Regionally Important Geological / Geomorphological Sites (RIGS) in Cumbria
Orton, Eden
Ravenstonedale